Hicetas was a Pythagorean philosopher from Syracusae Sicily.

Hicetas also  may refer to:
Hicetas (tyrant of Syracuse), Tyrant of Syracuse, 289 BC-278 BC
Hicetas of Leontini, a military leader of Syracuse and tyrant of Leontini, fl. c. 353 BC - 344 BC
Hicetas (Orchomenus), a king of Orchomenus in Arcadia, Greece. He was son of the elder Aristocrates of Orchomenus and father of the younger Aristocrates of Orchomenus.